Benjamin H. Kean ( – 1993) was an American physician, author, researcher and Professor of Medicine at Weill Cornell Medicine, widely known for his treatment of the Shah of Iran.  Kean was born in Valparaiso, Indiana, and grew up in West Orange, New Jersey and Manhattan. He graduated from the University of California at Berkeley, and earned a medical degree at Columbia University.  Kean was an expert on tropical and rare diseases.  He helped discover the cause of traveler's diarrhea and was also the personal doctor to the Shah of Iran who was in power during the 1970s.  Kean was also a medical educator and author. Kean died at the age of eighty-one from colon cancer.

Career summary
After graduating from Columbia University College of Physicians and Surgeons, he completed his medical internship & residency at Gorgas Hospital in the Panama Canal Zone. After completion of his residency, he remained on staff at Gorgas Hospital.  After the start of World War II, Kean was commissioned into the US Army Medical Corps, but remained at Gorgas Hospital, training US military physicians in tropical diseases.  After the war, he was the chief health officer for the German state of Hesse during the American occupation. He reached the rank of lieutenant colonel before demobilization in 1946.  After demobilization Kean began a career in academic medicine at Cornell.

Famous patients and colleagues
Over the years Kean worked with many famous people and leaders.  He was a doctor for celebrities such as Oscar Hammerstein, Edna Ferber, Gertrude Lawrence, Martina Navratilova and Salvador Dalí. Kean was the personal doctor for the Shah of Iran.  Arthur H. Wald, Manhattan cosmetic oral and maxillofacial surgeon, was Kean’s classmate and confidant.  Other notable Columbia classmates and lifelong friends include ophthalmologist, Virginia Lubkin and psychiatrist, Walter R. Bonime.  During World War II, Kean found that pilots that were shot down in the ocean were being attacked by sharks. He then discussed the dangers with President Roosevelt and as a result, shark repellent was given to pilots to prevent this danger.

Controversies
Kean was known for being an expert doctor on rare diseases, but also got embroiled in controversy.  Over the years of working with many people he befriended Tim Garrity who was a major gambler and had ties to organized crime. Kean also became a heavy gambler, and after his bookies operation was raided in 1959, he appeared in many newspapers and had to go to court which led to the end of his gambling. He also was caught in controversy after he was alleged to have played a central role in convincing the United States to allow the deposed Shah of Iran to be admitted into the US for medical treatment. President Carter's decision to allow the Shah entry to the U.S. led to the attack on the embassy in Tehran, Iran, in which 50 hostages were taken by militant Muslims and nationalists. However, Kean denied any such role, to the point of suing the journal Science for libel. In a settlement, Science stated that he had acted both professionally and ethically.

Accomplishments
Although Kean was mainly known for helping cure traveler's disease, he had other accomplishments as well.  In an autopsy of the writer Sherwood Anderson, Kean was able to find that the cause of death was from a colon puncture, caused by a toothpick-armed olive swallowed in a round of martinis.  He also wrote 175 scientific articles and wrote six books as well.  He started the tropical medicine program at Cornell Medical School, where he also became head of the parasitological laboratory.

Ben Kean Medal
The Ben Kean Medal is an honor awarded by the American Society of Tropical Medicine and Hygiene to a clinician or educator who impacts the people around them with the same traditions that Ben Kean first proposed.  It was created in honor of Ben Kean after his death.  The first recipient of the medal is his wife Colette Kean in 1994, and the first society member to receive it was Franklin A. Neva in 1995.

Personal life
Physician and Socialite Kean was married three times and was romantically involved with actress Joan Fontaine for eight years.  One of his ex-wives was the dance patron and philanthropist Rebekah Harkness.  Kean's autobiography, "M.D.: One Doctor's Adventures Among the Famous and Infamous from the Jungles of Panama to a Park Avenue Practice" vividly describes his life, friends, colleagues and patients in New York City high society.

References

External links
Finding Aid to the Benjamin Kean, MD (1912-1993) Papers at the Medical Center Archives of New York-Presbyterian/Weill Cornell

1910s births
1993 deaths
Year of birth uncertain
University of California, Berkeley alumni
Columbia University Vagelos College of Physicians and Surgeons alumni
American tropical physicians
United States Army Medical Corps officers
Deaths from colorectal cancer